Storskär (literally Big Skerry) is a steamship that was built in 1908 in Gothenburg. She was originally named Strängnäs Express and traded between Stockholm and Strängnäs on Lake Malaren. She was transferred to service on the Stockholm archipelago in 1939, and given her current name in the following year. Storskär has operated for Waxholmsbolaget and her predecessors since 1939, and is today one of that company's classic fleet, alongside Norrskär and Västan. She is a listed historical ship of Sweden.

History 
She was introduced in 1908 on the route from Strängnäs to Stockholm via Stallarholmen. The ship was sold in 1918 to Ångfartygs AB Drottningholm-Fittja, which in 1925 changed its name to Trafikaktiebolaget Mälaren-Hjelmaren. King Gustav V travelled on the ship from Stallarholmen to Strängnäs in 1923 in connection with the celebration of the 400th anniversary of Gustav Vasa's election as King of Sweden.

After another ownership change, Strängnäs Express was laid up in Stockholm in April 1939. In December 1939 she was purchased by Waxholms Nya Ångfartygs AB, better known as Waxholmsbolaget, who gave her her current name of Storskär in May 1940. The vessel was put into service on routes to the northern archipelago. Among other things, she traveled between Norrtälje and Arholma via . A new oil-fired boiler was installed in 1999 at Oskarshamns Varv.

Operation 
Storskär has been in regular traffic in the archipelago since 1940. She is still steam-powered and uses her original engine of 1908. Today, along with Vaxholmsbolaget's other classic ships, she is in regular traffic between May and September, serving the route from Stockholm to Vaxholm and other central archipelago islands.

References 

Storskär
Storskär
Storskär